William Henry French (1849 – May 31, 1893) was an American professional baseball player, who played in five games for the Baltimore Marylands in 1873.

References

External links

Major League Baseball infielders
Baltimore Marylands players
1849 births
19th-century baseball players
Baseball players from Baltimore
1893 deaths